Lily L.L. Kong  is a Singaporean geographer currently serving as president of the Singapore Management University (SMU). She is the first female and Singaporean academic to helm a Singapore university. Prior joining SMU, she was a faculty member at the Department of Geography of the National University of Singapore (NUS) and had held various senior managerial positions at NUS.

Career 
Kong graduated in 1986 from the National University of Singapore (NUS) with a bachelor's degree (honours) and obtained a M.A. from NUS in 1988. She then went on to complete a Ph.D. in Geography at University College London in 1991. A cultural geographer by training, she became a faculty member in the NUS Department of Geography in 1991 and served as the Dean of NUS's Faculty of Arts and Social Sciences from 2000 to 2003. She also held other senior managerial positions in NUS, including Dean of the University Scholars Programme, Vice Provost (Education), Vice Provost (Academic Personnel) Acting Executive Vice President (Academic Affairs) of the Yale-NUS College, Director of the Asia Research Institute, and Vice-President (University and Global Relations).

In September 2015, Kong joined Singapore Management University (SMU) as Provost and Lee Kong Chian Chair Professor of Social Sciences. At the start of 2019, she succeeded Belgian academic Arnoud De Meyer as President of SMU, becoming the first woman and also the first Singaporean academic to helm SMU.

As President of SMU, Kong has focused on enhancing the quality of the university's students and faculty, developing educational programmes, growing the impact of the university's research, and reforming the university's sexual harassment policy.

Kong has also been a member of Singapore's Public Service Commission since January 2009.

In September 2020, Kong was announced as one of the 25 outstanding female leaders in the Asia-Pacific region according to Forbes' list of 2020 Asia’s Power Businesswomen.

Research 
Kong has served as an editor or member of international editorial advisory boards for over 15 journals, including Social and Cultural Geography and Dialogues in Human Geography. She is also a series editor of Pacific Rim Geographies: Studies on Contemporary Culture, Environment, Cities and Development (Routledge), Co-Chief Editor of the ARI-Springer Asia Series, and Book Series Advisor for The Politics of Popular Culture in Asia Pacific (University of Illinois Press and Hong Kong University Press). She also has 19 books and monographs to her name, as well as over 150 papers in international refereed journals and chapters in books. Her research interests include religion, cultural policy and creative economy, national identity, globalisation and migration, and the social construction of nature and the environment.

Awards 
Kong is a recipient of the following awards:
Singaporean awards
 NUS Faculty of Arts and Social Sciences Teaching Excellence Award
 NUS Outstanding University Researcher Award
 National Book Development Council of Singapore Book Award
 Pingat Pentadbiran Awam (Perak) (Public Administration Medal(Silver)), 2006 
Bintang Bakti Masyarakat (Public Service Star), 2020

International awards
 Honorary Doctor of Science, Loughborough University
 Commonwealth Fellowship Award
 Fulbright Fellowship Award
 Association of American Geographers Robert Stoddard Award for Distinguished Service (Geography of Religion and Belief Systems)

References 

Singaporean university and college faculty deans
Singaporean women scientists
20th-century Singaporean women
National University of Singapore alumni
Academic staff of the National University of Singapore
Presidents of Singapore Management University
Members of the Public Service Commission (Singapore)
Alumni of University College London
20th-century geographers
Cultural geographers
Women geographers
Recipients of the Bintang Bakti Masyarakat
Singaporean people of Chinese descent
Living people
Year of birth missing (living people)
Women deans (academic)
Presidents of universities and colleges in Singapore
Women heads of universities and colleges